State Route 207 (SR 207) is a short state highway through the town of Scarborough, Maine. It connects Center Scarborough to the coastline at Prouts Neck. For its entire  length, it is called Black Point Road.

Major junctions

References

External links

Floodgap Roadgap's RoadsAroundME: Maine State Route 207

207
Transportation in Cumberland County, Maine